Nizar Assaad (in Arabic نزار أسعد) is a Canadian construction engineer of Syrian origin residing in Beirut, Lebanon and Dubai, UAE. He was the Founder and the Chairman of LEAD Contracting & Treading Ltd until his retirement in March 2020.

Biography
Assaad was born in Syria in 1948. He was the Founder and the Chairman of LEAD Contracting & Treading Ltd until his retirement in March 2020.

LEAD is specialized in building infrastructure of oil & gas including treatment plants, power plants, pipelines and other oil & gas and petrochemical facilities with strong expertise in electro-mechanical construction services, and large-scale civil construction & engineering projects. The company is registered in Jebel Ali Free Zone in UAE.

Personal life
He has been residing between Beirut & Dubai since late 2011. He is married, and has four children.

References

Syrian businesspeople
Living people
1948 births